The Puerto Rico Maritime Transport Authority  (ATM) is a government-owned corporation of Puerto Rico charged with providing maritime transportation services for cargo and passengers within Puerto Rico, including the island municipalities of Vieques and Culebra.

Services
The agency oversees three major services for maritime transportation within the Commonwealth of Puerto Rico. These include:

Executive director

2009present: Carlos D. Pérez Medina

External links

References

Puerto Rico Department of Transportation and Public Works
Government-owned corporations of Puerto Rico
Transportation in Puerto Rico
Maritime transport authorities